Ma Yingnan (born 3 March 1984) is a Chinese judoka.

She competed at the 2016 Summer Olympics in Rio de Janeiro, in the women's 52 kg.

References

External links
 
 

1984 births
Living people
People from Liaoning
Sportspeople from Liaoning
People from Shenyang
Sportspeople from Shenyang
Olympic judoka of China
Judoka at the 2016 Summer Olympics
Chinese female judoka
Asian Games medalists in judo
Judoka at the 2014 Asian Games
Asian Games bronze medalists for China
Medalists at the 2014 Asian Games
20th-century Chinese women
21st-century Chinese women